Gau Airport  is an airport on Gau Island, one of the Lomaiviti Islands in Fiji. It is operated by Airports Fiji Limited.

Facilities

Airlines and destinations

References

External links
 

Airports in Fiji
Lomaiviti Province